This is a list of fellows of the Royal Society elected in its 12th year, 1671.

Fellows 
Nehemiah Grew (1641–1712)
Martin Lister (1639–1712)
Sir Philip Matthews (1642–1685)
Sir Robert Reading (1640–1689)
Sir John Williams (1642–1680)

References

1671
1671 in England
1671 in science